I Love Us is a 2021 American romantic crime drama film directed by Danny A. Abeckaser and written by Kosta Kondilopoulos. The film stars Danny A. Abeckaser, Katie Cassidy, Jasper Polish, Harlow Jane, Jackie Cruz, and Robert Davi. It was released in the United States in select theaters and through video on demand on September 17, 2021, by Vision Films.

Plot

Cast
 Danny A. Abeckaser as Sammy Silver
 Katie Cassidy as Laura Fenton
 Harlow Jane as Audrey Fenton
 Jasper Polish as Rachel Fenton
 Robert Davi as Harvey Silverman
 James Madio as Richie Gould
 Greg Finley as Rob Fenton
 David Elliot as David Dallas
 Courtney Lopez as Maria Campos
 Jacqueline Chavez as Ruby Ellis
 Elya Baskin as Ira Prince
 Duke Christian George III as Omar
 Duke Jackson George IV as Omar's boy
 George Andreakos as Lorenzo
 Ray Bouderau as Garo
 Diana Madison as Principal Gloria West

Production
Filming wrapped in Los Angeles in March 2021.

Reception
Alan Ng of Film Threat rated the film a 7.5 out of 10.

References

External links
 

2021 films
2021 crime drama films
2021 romantic drama films
American crime drama films
American romantic drama films
Films shot in Los Angeles
Romantic crime films
2020s English-language films
2020s American films